Naked Attraction is a British television dating game show, broadcast on Channel 4. A clothed person is faced with six naked people who are initially hidden in booths. Their bodies and faces are gradually revealed through successive rounds, from the feet up. At each round, the chooser eliminates one naked person until only two are left, when the chooser also takes off their clothes to make the final choice. The chooser then decides which person they wish to go out with, and the two (or, occasionally, three) then go for a fully clothed date. The programme then presents their feedback after the date. It premiered on 25 July 2016 and is presented by Anna Richardson.

Numerous complaints about the programme were made by viewers to the broadcasting watchdog Ofcom due to the full-frontal nudity that is featured in the programme. Ofcom chose not to investigate as there was nothing that breached their rules: the show was purely a dating show and did not contain any sexual activity, and was shown after the watershed.

Production
One contestant reported that each episode can take up to twelve hours to film, although the contestant choosing a date only has to disrobe for fifteen minutes. The resultant date takes place at 9 a.m. the next day. The picker has to have someone with them at all times to make sure they do not accidentally bump into one of the contestants, and if one of the contestants needs a toilet break, they must be escorted out by a member of staff so the picker does not see them leave their coloured booth.

Contestants do not receive payment for participating, but standby contestants are given £75 for being in the room.

Transmissions

Regular series

Naughtiest Bits

International versions 
The TV format was exported to Germany, Denmark, Italy, Finland, Norway, Poland, Russia, and Sweden which have made their own versions of the show. The Netherlands had a similar show, called Undress for love, which has changes in format, but the premise is similar. It ran for six episodes in 2018.

See also
 Adam Zkt. Eva
 Buying Naked
 Dating Naked
 Naked and Afraid
 Naked News

References

External links
 
 
 

2016 British television series debuts
2010s British game shows
2010s British LGBT-related television series
2010s British reality television series
2020s British game shows
2020s British LGBT-related television series
2020s British reality television series
British dating and relationship reality television series
Channel 4 game shows
Channel 4 reality television shows
English-language television shows
2010s LGBT-related reality television series
2020s LGBT-related reality television series
Television series by All3Media
Nudity in television